Agvali is a rural locality (a selo) and the administrative center of Tsumadinsky District of the Republic of Dagestan, Russia. Population:

References

Notes

Sources

Rural localities in Tsumadinsky District